Foss State Park is a  Oklahoma state park located on Foss Lake, in southwestern Custer County, Oklahoma, near the city of Foss.

Recreational activities include hiking, biking, horseback riding, fishing, boating, swimming and camping. Facilities include 110 RV campsites, 10 of which have full-hookups and 100 that are semi-modern. All sites are paved and offer 30 amp or 50 amp service plus water. Big rig sites, shaded sites and 35 tent sites are also available. Foss State Park has an equestrian camp with a multi-purpose trail for horseback riding, hiking and mountain biking. Horse rental is not available. The park also features picnic areas, group picnic shelters, grills, fire rings, comfort stations with showers, lighted boat ramps, boat storage, boat rentals, playgrounds, swimming beach and a seasonal marina.

Fees
To help fund a backlog of deferred maintenance and park improvements, the state implemented an entrance fee for this park and 21 others effective June 15, 2020.  The fees, charged per vehicle, start at $10 per day for a single-day or $8 for residents with an Oklahoma license plate or Oklahoma tribal plate.  Fees are waived for honorably discharged veterans and Oklahoma residents age 62 & older and their spouses.  Passes good for three days or a week are also available; annual passes good at all 22 state parks charging fees are offered at a cost of $75 for out-of-state visitors or $60 for Oklahoma residents.  The 22 parks are:
 Arrowhead Area at Lake Eufaula State Park
 Beavers Bend State Park
 Boiling Springs State Park
 Cherokee Landing State Park
 Fort Cobb State Park
 Foss State Park
 Honey Creek Area at Grand Lake State Park
 Great Plains State Park
 Great Salt Plains State Park
 Greenleaf State Park
 Keystone State Park
 Lake Eufaula State Park
 Lake Murray State Park
 Lake Texoma State Park
 Lake Thunderbird State Park
 Lake Wister State Park
 Natural Falls State Park
 Osage Hills State Park
 Robbers Cave State Park
 Sequoyah State Park
 Tenkiller State Park
 Twin Bridges Area at Grand Lake State Park

Foss Reservoir and dam 

Foss Reservoir was created by the United States Bureau of Reclamation in 1961 by impounding the Washita River. Water is conveyed from the reservoir to the project cities through  of aqueducts and laterals.

References 

Protected areas of Custer County, Oklahoma
State parks of Oklahoma
Reservoirs in Oklahoma
Landforms of Custer County, Oklahoma